The 2020 Sun Belt women's basketball tournament was the postseason women's basketball tournament for the Sun Belt Conference scheduled to be held from March 10 to March 15, 2020, at the Smoothie King Center in New Orleans. The winner of the tournament would have received a first-round bye to the 2020 NCAA tournament. On March 12, the NCAA announced that the tournament was cancelled due to the coronavirus pandemic.

Seeds

Schedule

References

External links
Championship Schedule

Sun Belt Conference women's basketball tournament
2019–20 Sun Belt Conference women's basketball season
Sun Belt Conference Women's B
Sun Belt Conference women's basketball tournament